Eudarcia is a genus of moths belonging to the family Tineidae.

Species
These 82 species belong to the genus Eudarcia:

 Eudarcia alanyacola Gaedike, 2011
 Eudarcia abchasicum Zagulajev, 1979
 Eudarcia alberti (Amsel, 1957)
 Eudarcia alludens (Meyrick, 1919)
 Eudarcia alvearis (Meyrick, 1919)
 Eudarcia anaglypta (Meyrick, 1893) (from Australia)
 Eudarcia argyrophaea (Forbes, 1931)
 Eudarcia armatum (Gaedike, 1985)
 Eudarcia atlantica Henderickx, 1995
 Eudarcia aureliani (Capuse, 1967)
 Eudarcia balcaicum (Gaedike, 1988)
 Eudarcia balcanicum (Gaedike, 1988)
 Eudarcia bicolorella (Forbes, 1931)
 Eudarcia brachyptera (Passerin d'Entreves, 1974)
 Eudarcia caucasica (Zagulajev, 1978)
 Eudarcia celidopa (Fletcher, 1933)
 Eudarcia cocosensis (Davis, 1994)
 Eudarcia confusella (Heydenreich, 1851)
 Eudarcia croaticum (Petersen, 1962)
 Eudarcia cuniculata (Meyrick, 1919)
 Eudarcia daghestanica (Zagulajev, 1993)
 Eudarcia dalmaticum (Gaedike, 1988)
 Eudarcia deferens (Meyrick, 1927)
 Eudarcia defluescens (Meyrick, 1934)
 Eudarcia dentata Gaedike, 2000
 Eudarcia derrai (Gaedike, 1983)
 Eudarcia diarthra (Meyrick, 1919)
 Eudarcia echinatum (Petersen & Gaedike, 1985)
 Eudarcia egregiellum (Petersen, 1973)
 Eudarcia eunitariaeella (Chambers, 1873) (from North America)
 Eudarcia fasciata (Staudinger, 1880)
 Eudarcia fibigeri Gaedike, 1997
 Eudarcia forsteri (Petersen, 1964)
 Eudarcia gallica (Petersen, 1962)
 Eudarcia glaseri (Petersen, 1967) (from Europe)
 Eudarcia gracilis (Petersen, 1968)
 Eudarcia graecum (Gaedike, 1985)
 Eudarcia granulatella (Zeller, 1852)
 Eudarcia haliplancta (Meyrick, 1927)
 Eudarcia hedemanni (Rebel, 1899)
 Eudarcia hellenica Gaedike, 2007
 Eudarcia herculanella (Capuse, 1966)
 Eudarcia holtzi (Rebel, 1902)
 Eudarcia ignara (Meyrick, 1922)
 Eudarcia ignorata Bidzily 2016 (from Greece)
 Eudarcia incincta (Meyrick, 1919)
 Eudarcia isoploca (Meyrick, 1919)
 Eudarcia jaworskii Gaedike, 2011
 Eudarcia kasyi (Petersen, 1971)
 Eudarcia lamprodeta (Meyrick, 1919)
 Eudarcia lapidicolella (Herrich-Schäffer, 1854)
 Eudarcia lattakianum (Petersen, 1968)
 Eudarcia leopoldella (O.G.Costa, 1836)
 Eudarcia lobata (Petersen & Gaedike, 1979)
 Eudarcia mensella (Walsingham, 1900)
 Eudarcia microptera Dominguez
 Eudarcia montanum (Gaedike, 1985)
 Eudarcia moreae (Petersen & Gaedike, 1983)
 Eudarcia nerviella (Amsel, 1954) (from Europe)
 Eudarcia nigraella (Mariani, 1937)
 Eudarcia oceanica 
 Eudarcia orbiculidomus (Sakai & Saigusa, 1999)
 Eudarcia ornata Gaedike, 2000
 Eudarcia pagenstecherella (Hubner, 1825)
 Eudarcia palanfreella Baldizzone & Gaedike, 2004
 Eudarcia petrologa (Meyrick, 1919)
 Eudarcia plumella (Walsingham, 1892)
 Eudarcia protograpta (Meyrick, 1935)
 Eudarcia richardsoni (Walsingham, 1900) (from Europe)
 Eudarcia romanum (Petersen, 1968)
 Eudarcia sacculata (Gozmány, 1968) (from Ghana & Sierra Leone)
 Eudarcia sardoa (Passerin d'Entreves, 1978)
 Eudarcia saucropis (Meyrick, 1911) (from Seychelles)
 Eudarcia saxatilis Bidzily 2016 (from Crimea)
 Eudarcia servilis (Meyrick, 1914)
 Eudarcia simulatricella Clemens, 1860 (from Europe)
 Eudarcia sinjovi Gaedike, 2000
 Eudarcia subtile (Petersen, 1973)
 Eudarcia sutteri Gaedike, 1997
 Eudarcia tetraonella (Walsingham, 1897)
 Eudarcia tischeriella (Walsingham, 1897)
 Eudarcia turcica Gaedike, 1997
 Eudarcia vacriensis (Parenti, 1964)
 Eudarcia verkerki Gaedike & Henderickx, 1999

References

Tineidae
Tineidae genera